Reason Chesnutt "R. C." Bell (January 28, 1880 – February 19, 1962) was a justice of the Supreme Court of Georgia from 1932 to 1949, including service as chief justice from 1943 to 1946.

Early years and education
Born near Preston, in Webster County, Georgia, to Reason Alexander Bell and Martha Elliott Bell, he attended the public schools and received his J.D. from Mercer University in 1902.

Law career
Bell entered the practice of law in Sylvester, Georgia in 1902, then moved to Cairo, Georgia in 1905. On January 1, 1913, he became solicitor general of the Albany Circuit, serving until his appointment to the Superior Court effective January 1, 1921. On January 24, 1922, he was appointed to the Georgia Court of Appeals, to which he was later elected and then re-elected, remaining until his appointment to the state supreme court by  Governor Richard B. Russell.

Legacy and death
Bell was the father of Vereen Bell, born in 1911, who authored the novel Swamp Water in 1941, which was made into a film that same year.

Bell died in his home at the age of 82, following a long illness.

References

External links

Justices of the Supreme Court of Georgia (U.S. state)
Mercer University alumni
1880 births
1962 deaths
People from Webster County, Georgia
20th-century American judges